Robert Henley, 1st Earl of Northington, PC (c. 1708 – 14 January 1772), was the Lord High Chancellor of Great Britain. He was a member of the Whig Party in the parliament and was known for his wit and writing.

Family
Born the second son of Anthony Henley, Robert Henley was from a wealthy family in Hampshire. His grandfather, Sir Robert Henley, had been Master of the Court of the King's Bench, essentially a defence counsel.

Henley's father Anthony Henley was educated at Oxford and interested in literature. When he moved to London, he became the friend of the Earls of Dorset and Sunderland, as well as a friend of Swift, Pope, and Burnet. After becoming a married man, Anthony Henley had been the Member of Parliament for Andover in 1698. He died in August, 1711 and was succeeded in turn by his eldest son, Anthony and his second son, Robert.

Early life

Henley was educated at Westminster School and attended St. John's College in Oxford. He gained a fellowship at the All Souls College in 1727, entered the Inner Temple to study law in 1729 and was called to the bar on 23 June 1732. He succeeded his elder brother in 1746, inheriting The Grange, Northington in Hampshire which had been built for his grandfather by Inigo Jones.

Career
He was elected a Member of Parliament for Bath in 1747 and became Recorder of the town in 1751. He was appointed Attorney General and knighted in 1756 and promoted the next year to Lord Keeper of the Great Seal, the last person to receive this title. Although as Lord Keeper he presided over the House of Lords, he was not made a peer until 1760 when he became Baron Henley of Grange in the County of Southampton. When George III ascended to power, Henley was appointed Lord High Chancellor of Great Britain in 1761 and made Earl of Northington in 1764.

The delay in raising him to the peerage was due to the hostility of George II, who resented Henley's former support of the Prince of Wales's faction, known as the Leicester House party; and it was in order that he might preside as Lord High Steward at the trial of the Earl Ferrers for murder in 1760 that he then received his patent. He resigned from his position in 1767 and died at his residence in Hampshire on 14 January 1772.

Personal life
In 1743, Henley had married Jane Huband who was the daughter of Sir John Huband of Ipsley of Warwickshire. He had three sons and five daughters. The names of his daughters were:

 Lady Catherine Henley (d. 9 Jan 1779); 
 Lady Bridget Henley (d. 13 March 1796), married 1) Robert Lane and 2) Capt. Hon. John Tollemache (30 March 1750 – 25 September 1777); 
 Jane Henley (d. February 1823); 
 Lady Elizabeth Henley (d. 20 August 1821); 
 Mary Henley (1753–1814), married 1) Edward Ligonier, 1st Earl Ligonier, and 2) Thomas Noel, 2nd Viscount Wentworth.

He was succeeded by his son Robert Henley, 2nd Earl of Northington.

Cases
Vernon v Bethell (1762) 28 ER 838, "necessitous men are not, truly speaking, free men, but, to answer a present exigency, will submit to any terms that the crafty may impose upon them."
Shanley v Harvey (1763) 2 Eden 126, 127, as "soon as a man sets foot on English ground he is free".
Brown v Peck (1758) 1 Eden 140, provisions discouraging cohabitation were void against public policy, as where a will promised £5 a month to a beneficiary to split up from her husband, or £2 otherwise. She was entitled to the £5.
Hussey v. Dillon 2 Amb 603, 604, testament and meaning of "grandchildren"
1 Eden 5, "The Court has always in cases of this nature considered the question of consent with great latitude, adhering to the spirit and not the letter. The maxim Qui tacet satis loquitur has therefore been respected, and constructive consents have been looked upon as entitled to as much regard as if conveyed in express terms".
Earl of Buckinghamshire v Drury
Pike v Hoare, 2 Eden, 182; Amb. 428, on conflict of laws, a will affecting lands in the Colonies "is not triable" in this country.
Burgess v Wheate 1 Eden, 251

Notes

References
A memoir of the life of Robert Henely, earl of Northington, lord high chancellor of Great Britain
The Complete peerage of England, Scotland, Ireland, Great Britain and the United Kingdoms, Extant, Extinct or Dormant
Burke's Peerage, Baronetage & Knightage
re: Penancoet Family
Complete Baronetage
Burke's Peerage and Baronetage
A genealogical survey of the peerage of Britain as well as the royal families of Europe

1708 births
1772 deaths
People educated at Westminster School, London
Alumni of St John's College, Oxford
Members of the Inner Temple
Henley, Robert
Henley, Robert
Henley, Robert
Earls in the Peerage of Great Britain
Lord chancellors of Great Britain
Lord High Stewards
Lord-Lieutenants of Hampshire
Lord Presidents of the Council
Members of the Privy Council of Great Britain
Peers of Great Britain created by George II
Barons Henley